The geology of Oman includes varied landscapes which are a blend of its geological history, and its climate over the past few million years. Rock outcrops in Al Hajar Mountains, the Huqf and Dhofar are a point of interest for international geologists. The rock record spans about 825 million years and includes at least three periods when the country was covered by ice.

Oman, located at the southeast corner of the Arabian plate, is being pushed slowly northward, as the Red Sea grows wider. The lofty Hajar Mountains and the drowned valleys of Musandam are dramatic reminders of this. Generally speaking Oman is fairly quiescent tectonically.  Musandan experiences occasional tremors as the Arabian Plate collides with the Eurasian Plate.

During the Cretaceous Period Oman was located adjacent to a subduction zone and a portion of the upper mantle along with overlying seafloor volcanic rocks were thrust over the continental crust. This obducted sequence of ultramafic to mafic rocks is the Semail Ophiolite complex. The ophiolite is locally rich in copper and chromite orebodies.

The interior plains of Oman are of young sedimentary rocks, wadi gravels, dune sands and salt flats. Beneath them is a several kilometre-thick stack of older sedimentary rocks that host the country's hydrocarbon resources. Ancient salt, which comes to the surface in several salt domes such as Qarat Kibrit, plays an important role in forming many of these oil and gas accumulations.

Oman has become a major destination for geotourism and an increasing number of visitors are attracted by the spectacular outcrops the country has to offer.

See also
 Al Hajar Mountains
 Dhofar Mountains
 Hills of Masirah Island
 Jebel Hafeet

References

 Oman's Geological Heritage; 2nd edition.  Petroleum Development Oman LLC, 2006
 http://www.dsfu.univ-montp2.fr/omanophiolite/pages1_sommaire.htm